The 340mm/28 Modèle 1881 gun was a heavy naval gun of the French Navy.

History
The type was used in single mountings on the ironclads of the Marceau class, and on the Hoche.

Railway guns

Eight guns were converted from naval use to railway guns by Schneider and designated Canon de 340 modèle 1881/84 à glissement.  The conversions were ordered during 1917 but they weren't delivered until January 1919 after the war had ended.  The guns were suspended from two six-axle rail bogies and used carriage recoil known as the glissement system.  The guns had no traverse mechanism so aiming was done by drawing the guns across a section of curved track.

See also

Weapons of comparable role, performance and era
 BL 13.5 inch naval gun Mk I – IV : British equivalent

Notes

External links 
 PIECES LOURDES : 240 et plus

Naval guns of France
340 mm artillery